Gideon (Arrowverse) may refer to:

Gideon (The Flash), an artificial intelligence from the television series The Flash
Gideon (Legends of Tomorrow), an artificial intelligence from the television series Legends of Tomorrow